Three Letters to the Moon is a studio album by Fabius Constable & Celtic Harp Orchestra, released by Ethnoworld in 2010.

Tracks
 Introitus II
 Nausicaa's Reflections
 No Time Nylus
 Concerning the Theft of an Airliner
 Luna Shine for me
 The Infinite Beauty of a Spotless Tofu
 Almuthada's Bliss
 Kerry the Kingdom
 From Another Life
 Children of Llyr
 La Porta
 Paolo + Francesca
 Bonifacio
 Dante's Dream

Musicians
Fabius Constable : Director, Cello, Harp, Piano, Low Whistle, Tin Whistle, Accordion.

Donatella Bortone: Soprano

Sabrina Noseda: Harp, Vocal in "Concernig the Theft of an Airliner"
Chiara Vincenzi: Harp
Danilo Marzorati: Harp
Pauline Fazzioli: Harp
Federica Maestri: Harp, Choir, Flute
Ludwig Constable: Harp
Antonella d'Apote : Harp
Silla Orlando: Harp
Patrizia Rossi: Harp
Teodora Cianferoni: Harp
Giada Pederzoli : Harp
Chiara Rolla: Harp
Lidia Morra: Harp
Daniela Morittu: Harp
Rossana Monico: Harp, Bassoon
Maria Assunta Romeo: Harp
Luca Cascone: Harp
Daniele Cereghini: Harp

Filippo Pedretti: Violin
Stefano Zeni: Violin

Stefano Serano: Bass guitar

Luca Briccola: Guitars

Massimo Cerra: Oboe

Wang Xue Ting : Ehru

Mirko Soncini: Drum, Percussion, Tubular bells
Flaviano Cuffari: Percussion

Yako Kanazawa : Vocal in "Introitus II"

Sonia Lanzoni: Choir
Marco Carenzio: Choir
Riccardo Tabbì: Choir
Francesca Salcioli: Choir
Alessandro Mazzoni: Choir, Ocarina
Anne Delaby: Choir
Germana Ciervo: Choir
Irene Casartelli: Choir

Children's choir: Celine Lancini Martinez, Edoardo Nerboni, Cesare Primultini, Jacopo Buttini, Michele Moralli, Lorenzo Lecchi, Maurizia Delius, Elia Lavelti, Sofia Lavelti, Sheila Frattari, Arthur Delius, Maja Rossignoli, Demis Crameri, Leando Cantori, Valentin Wehrli, Alice C. Guisiano, Emilia Renn, Julius Renn, Sebastian Renn, Louis Deltenre, Raffele Canonica Sermoneta.

Celtic Harp Orchestra albums
2010 albums